Madigan's Millions (It: Un dollaro per 7 vigliacchi, Sp: El Millón de Madigan) is a 1968 Italian-Spanish comedy crime film directed by Stanley Prager and produced by Sidney W. Pink.

The movie was shot in 1966 but was not released for two years. It stars Dustin Hoffman, in his first movie role, as Jason Fister, a young U.S. Treasury Dept. official sent to Rome to recover a large sum of money owed to the United States government by a deceased mobster.

The film is in the lowbrow comedy genre, with comic stop-action chase scenes, as well as many scenes involving Spaghetti Western-style gunplay on the streets of Rome. Hoffman's Fister is a seemingly naive and mild-mannered bureaucrat with a sense for sniffing out phonies.

The interiors of the film were shot largely in Spain, with exteriors in Rome.

Plot

Cast
 Dustin Hoffman – Jason Fister 
 Elsa Martinelli – Vic Shaw
 Cesar Romero – Mike Madigan 
 Gustavo Rojo – Lt. Arco
 Fernando Hilbeck – Burke
 Riccardo Garrone – Cirini
 Franco Fabrizi – Caronda
 Umberto Raho – Photographer
 Gérard Tichy – J. P. Ogilvie

Release
The film was released in the United States by American International Pictures in 1969 after Hoffman's success in The Graduate and Midnight Cowboy.

See also
Who's Minding the Mint? (1967)

External links

References

1968 films
Films set in Italy
Spanish crime comedy films
Italian crime comedy films
Films produced by Sidney W. Pink
English-language Italian films
English-language Spanish films
1960s English-language films
1960s Italian films
1960s Spanish films